Khalid Alvi (born 20 December 1957) is a Pakistani former cricketer. He played 59 first-class cricket matches for several domestic teams in Pakistan between 1971 and 1986.

He made his highest score of 219 for Karachi against Railways in November 1980, when he put on 418 for the first wicket with Kamal Najamuddin.

See also
 List of Pakistan Automobiles Corporation cricketers

References

External links
 

1957 births
Living people
Pakistani cricketers
Karachi cricketers
Pakistan Automobiles Corporation cricketers
Pakistan International Airlines cricketers
Public Works Department cricketers
Cricketers from Karachi
Sindh cricketers